Sushanta Borgohain is an Indian politician. He was elected to the Assam Legislative Assembly from Thowra in the 2021 Assam Legislative Assembly election as a member of the Indian National Congress. He previously served from 2011 to 2016. In June 2021, he resigned from the Indian National Congress due to internal differences in the party. He joined Bharatiya Janata Party in presence of Chief Minister of Assam Himanta Biswa Sarma.

References

Living people
Year of birth missing (living people)
Indian politicians
Assam MLAs 2011–2016
People from Sivasagar district
Indian National Congress politicians from Assam
Assam MLAs 2021–2026
Members of the Assam Legislative Assembly
Bharatiya Janata Party politicians from Assam